The monarchy of Solomon Islands is a system of government in which a constitutional monarch is the head of state of Solomon Islands. The present monarch and head of state, since 8 September 2022, is King Charles III, who is also the head of state of fourteen other Commonwealth realms. Although the person of the sovereign is equally shared with 14 other independent countries within the Commonwealth of Nations, each country's monarchy is separate and legally distinct. As a result, the current monarch is officially titled the King of Solomon Islands and, in this capacity, he and other members of the royal family undertake public and private functions domestically and abroad as representatives of Solomon Islands. However, the King is the only member of the royal family with any constitutional role.

While several powers are of the sovereign alone, most of the constitutional and ceremonial duties in Solomon Islands are carried out by the monarch's representative, the governor-general of Solomon Islands.

History
Solomon Islands gained self-government in 1976 following the independence of neighbouring Papua New Guinea from Australia in 1975. As a protectorate, the British Solomon Islands had been administered by the British government.  Following the Solomon Islands Act 1978 the protectorate became a Commonwealth realm with Elizabeth II, Queen of Solomon Islands as its head of state. The new constitution, providing for fully responsible status within the Commonwealth, took effect under The Solomon Islands Independence Order 1978, an order in council which had been requested by the Legislative Assembly. It was made under the Foreign Jurisdiction Act 1890, and came into operation on 7 July 1978.

Constitutional role
The Commonwealth of Nations has 56 member states, of which, fifteen are unofficially described as Commonwealth realms that recognise, individually, Charles III as their monarch and therefore head of state; Solomon Islands is one of these. Each realm, including Solomon Islands, is a sovereign and independent state. Charles III exercises his sovereignty only as King of Solomon Islands and on all matters relating to Solomon Islands, the monarch is advised solely by Solomon Islands ministers.

As in the other Commonwealth realms, the monarch's role is almost entirely symbolic and cultural. The powers that are constitutionally his are exercised almost wholly upon the advice of the cabinet, made up of Ministers of the Crown. On all matters of Solomon Islands, the monarch is advised solely by Solomon Islands ministers.

The Crown and Honours
Within the Commonwealth realms, the monarch is the fount of honour. Similarly, the monarch, as Sovereign of Solomon Islands, confers awards and honours in Solomon Islands in his name. Most of them are often awarded on the advice of "His Majesty's Solomon Island Ministers".

The Crown and the Police Force

The Police Force of Solomon Islands is known as the "Royal Solomon Islands Police Force". Under the Police Act 2013, all officers in the Police Force have to swear allegiance to the monarch of Solomon Islands, before taking office. The current oath is:

The Crown and Government

The Solomon Islands Government is officially known as "His Majesty's Government of Solomon Islands".

The monarch of Solomon Islands is represented by the Governor-General of Solomon Islands, who is a citizen of Solomon Islands elected for a five-year term by the national parliament. Formally, the monarch appoints the Governor-General on the advice of parliament. The current Governor-General is the Anglican Archbishop Emeritus of Melanesia and former Bishop of the Diocese of Central Melanesia, David Vunagi, who was first elected in 2019. Governors-General must meet the same eligibility requirements as members of parliament and can serve no more than two terms.

All executive powers of Solomon Islands rest with the sovereign. All laws in Solomon Islands are enacted only with the granting of Royal Assent, done by the Governor-General on behalf of the sovereign.

The Governor-General is also responsible for proroguing, and dissolving the National Parliament. The opening of a session of Parliament is accompanied by the Speech from the Throne by the Governor-General.

The Crown and the Courts

Within the Commonwealth realms, the sovereign is responsible for rendering justice for all his subjects, and is thus traditionally deemed the fount of justice. In Solomon Islands, criminal offences are legally deemed to be offences against the sovereign and proceedings for indictable offences are brought in the sovereign's name in the form of The King versus [Name], Rex versus [Name] or R versus [Name]. Hence, the common law holds that the sovereign "can do no wrong"; the monarch cannot be prosecuted in his or her own courts for criminal offences.

The monarch, and by extension the governor-general, can also grant immunity from prosecution, exercise the royal prerogative of mercy, and pardon offences against the Crown, either before, during, or after a trial.

Succession

Like some realms, Solomon Islands defers to United Kingdom law to determine the line of succession.

Succession is by absolute primogeniture governed by the provisions of the Succession to the Crown Act 2013, as well as the Act of Settlement, 1701, and the Bill of Rights, 1689. This legislation limits the succession to the natural (i.e. non-adopted), legitimate descendants of Sophia, Electress of Hanover, and stipulates that the monarch cannot be a Roman Catholic, and must be in communion with the Church of England upon ascending the throne. Though these constitutional laws, as they apply to Solomon Islands, still lie within the control of the British Parliament, both the United Kingdom and Solomon Islands cannot change the rules of succession without the unanimous consent of the other realms, unless explicitly leaving the shared monarchy relationship; a situation that applies identically in all the other realms, and which has been likened to a treaty amongst these countries.

Cultural role

The King's Official Birthday is a public holiday in Solomon Islands where it is usually celebrated on the second Saturday of June every year. It is regarded as one of the most important events of the year in Solomon Islands. The day starts with the police marching band performing in the capital city of Honiara. Rallies are held all over the islands, which is followed by sporting events and custom dancing, and the celebrations and parties go long into the night.

The Governor-General of Solomon Islands delivers a speech on the King's Birthday, and honours and medals are given to those who have done valiant things and great service for Solomon Islands and its people.

Title
The Royal Style and Titles Act 2013 of the National Parliament of Solomon Islands granted the monarch a separate title in his role as King of Solomon Islands. The new style was already in non-statutory use since 1988, when it was included in the Ministry of Foreign Affairs and External Trade Manual.

The current style of the monarch of Solomon Islands is: Charles the Third, by the Grace of God, King of Solomon Islands and His other Realms and Territories, Head of the Commonwealth.

Oath of allegiance
The oath of allegiance in Solomon Islands is:

Royal visits

Members of the royal family occasionally visit Solomon Islands. Elizabeth II visited twice: in February 1974 (before independence) and in October 1982 (after the 1982 Commonwealth Games). Prince Philip, Duke of Edinburgh, accompanied her on both occasions, and also visited without her, in 1959 and 1971. Princess Anne and Mark Phillips visited in 1974 and the Duke and the Duchess of Cambridge visited in 2012.

List of Solomon Island monarchs

References

Government of the Solomon Islands
Politics of the Solomon Islands
Solomon Islands
Heads of state of the Solomon Islands
1978 establishments in the Solomon Islands
Solomon Islands
Kingdoms